Forsch is a surname. Notable people with the surname include: 

Bob Forsch (1950–2011), American baseball player
Ken Forsch (born 1946), American baseball player

See also
Horsch